Events from the year 1526 in Sweden

Incumbents
 Monarch – Gustav I

Events

 - The New Testament and a psalm book is published in the Swedish language by Olaus Petri.
 - Kungliga Hovkapellet
 - The King demands confiscation of clerical property. 
 - The German Melchior Hoffman holds apocalyptic sermons in the German congregation in Stockholm. 
 - The King sends a monk from Vadstena Abbey to mission Christianity among the Sami.

Births

Deaths

References

 
Years of the 16th century in Sweden
Sweden